The gens Horatia was a patrician family at ancient Rome.  In legend, the gens dates back to the time of Tullus Hostilius, the third King of Rome. One of its members, Marcus Horatius Pulvillus, was consul suffectus in 509 BC, the first year of the Republic, and again in 507. The most famous of the Horatii was his nephew, Publius Horatius Cocles, who held the Sublician bridge against the army of Lars Porsena circa 508 BC.

Origin
The nomen Horatius is said to have been derived from the hero Horatus, to whom an oak wood was dedicated. The gens was certainly of Latin origin, although there was some uncertainty as to when they arrived at Rome. A legend relates that in the reign of Tullus Hostilius, the fate of the ancient city of Alba Longa was decided by combat between three brothers from that city and three from Rome. The historian Livy states that most sources assigned the Horatii to Rome, and their opponents, the Curiatii, to Alba Longa. The victory of the Horatii was a pretext for the destruction of Alba Longa, and the transfer of its noble families to Rome.

Praenomina
The Horatii favored the praenomina Publius, Marcus, Lucius, and Gaius.

Branches and cognomina
The Horatii of the Republic bore the surnames Barbatus, Cocles, and Pulvillus.  Of these, Barbatus and Pulvillus were family names, while Cocles appears to have been a personal cognomen, given to the hero of the Sublician bridge.  Plutarch supposes that it was derived from the Greek cyclops, because he had lost an eye, or because the shape of his face made it appear as if he had but one eye.  Cocles is said to have been the nephew of Marcus Horatius Pulvillus, and if he left any issue, they do not seem to have carried on his surname. Other surnames appearing amongst the Horatii in later times may have been adopted by freedmen of the gens; the poet Horace was the son of a libertinus, and the cognomen Flaccus is not otherwise found amongst the Horatii.

Members

 Publius Horatius, father of the Horatii who fought against the Curiatii, absolved his son of guilt in the death of his sister. In some versions of the story, his praenomen is Marcus.
 Publius Horatius, one of the Horatii, three brothers who fought against the three Curiatii in the reign of Tullus Hostilius; and the sole survivor of the combat.  Enraged by his sister's grief for one of the slain Curiatii, to whom she had been betrothed, he slew her as well, and by custom his life was forfeit; but their father decreed that in light of his service to his country, his penance was to pass under the yoke.
 Horatia Camilla, sister of the Horatii, was betrothed to one of the Curiatii, and because of her display of grief was slain by her victorious brother.  An ancient tomb near the Porta Capena was said to have been hers.
 Publius Horatius Cocles, one of the heroes of the Republic, defended the Sublician bridge against the army of Lars Porsena, circa 508 BC.
 Quintus Horatius Flaccus, a poet during the time of Augustus, circa 1st century BC

Horatii Pulvilli
 Marcus Horatius Pulvillus, father of the consul of 509, and according to legend, grandfather of Publius Horatius Cocles.
 Marcus Horatius M. f. Pulvillus, consul suffectus in 509 BC, the first year of the Republic; he was consul again in 507.
 Gaius Horatius M. f. M. n. Pulvillus, consul in 477 and 457 BC; he defeated the Aequi.
 Publius Horatius (Pulvillus), according to Dionysius of Halicarnassus, one of the consuls in 453 BC; other sources give Publius Curiatius Fistus Trigeminus.
 Lucius Horatius Pulvillus, consular tribune in 386 BC.
 Marcus Horatius Pulvillus, consular tribune in 378 BC.

Horatii Barbati
 Marcus Horatius M. f. L. n. Barbatus, with Lucius Valerius Potitus, helped to abolish the decemvirate in 449 BC; the two elected consuls for the same year; Horatius triumphed over the Sabines.
 Lucius Horatius M. f. M. n. Barbatus, consular tribune in 425 BC.

See also
 List of Roman gentes

References

Bibliography
 Marcus Tullius Cicero, De Republica, Pro Milone.
 Diodorus Siculus, Bibliotheca Historica (Library of History).
 Dionysius of Halicarnassus, Romaike Archaiologia (Roman Antiquities).
 Titus Livius (Livy), History of Rome.
 Valerius Maximus, Factorum ac Dictorum Memorabilium (Memorable Facts and Sayings).
 Lucius Annaeus Seneca (Seneca the Younger), Epistulae Morales ad Lucilium (Moral Letters to Lucilius).
 Lucius Mestrius Plutarchus (Plutarch), Lives of the Noble Greeks and Romans.
 Lucius Annaeus Florus, Epitome de T. Livio Bellorum Omnium Annorum DCC (Epitome of Livy: All the Wars of Seven Hundred Years).
 Sextus Aurelius Victor, De Viris Illustribus (On Famous Men).
 Joannes Zonaras, Epitome Historiarum (Epitome of History).
 Dictionary of Greek and Roman Biography and Mythology, William Smith, ed., Little, Brown and Company, Boston (1849).
 T. Robert S. Broughton, The Magistrates of the Roman Republic, American Philological Association (1952–1986).

 
Roman gentes